The steel-blue whydah (Vidua hypocherina) is a species of bird in the family Viduidae.
It is found in Ethiopia, Kenya, Somalia, South Sudan, Tanzania, and Uganda.
Its natural habitat is dry savanna.

References

steel-blue whydah
Birds of East Africa
steel-blue whydah
Taxonomy articles created by Polbot